Yuan Mingcan (born 12 December 1989) is a Chinese footballer currently playing as a midfielder for Jiangxi Beidamen.

Career statistics

Club
.

Notes

References

1989 births
Living people
Chinese footballers
Association football midfielders
China League Two players
China League One players
Wuhan F.C. players
Jiangxi Beidamen F.C. players